Wang Shasha (born 14 October 1986) is a Chinese goalball player. She won a silver medal at both the 2008 Summer Paralympics and the 2012 Summer Paralympics.

Personal life
Wang is married to goalball player Cai Changgui, who is also blind. The couple live in Hangzhou.

References

Female goalball players
1986 births
Living people
Sportspeople from Jiangsu
People from Shuyang County
Paralympic goalball players of China
Paralympic silver medalists for China
Goalball players at the 2008 Summer Paralympics
Goalball players at the 2012 Summer Paralympics
Medalists at the 2008 Summer Paralympics
Medalists at the 2012 Summer Paralympics
Paralympic medalists in goalball
21st-century Chinese women